Iiro Vanha (born 17 December 1994) is a Finnish professional footballer who plays as a midfielder.

References

1997 births
Living people
Finnish footballers
TP-47 players
FC Santa Claus players
Kemi City F.C. players
Salon Palloilijat players
Veikkausliiga players
Kakkonen players
Association football midfielders